Sphingobacterium anhuiense is a Gram-negative, strictly aerobic, rod-shaped and non-motile bacterium from the genus of Sphingobacterium which has been isolated from forest soil in the Anhui province in China.

References

External links
Type strain of Sphingobacterium anhuiense at BacDive -  the Bacterial Diversity Metadatabase

Sphingobacteriia
Bacteria described in 2008